Trams in Wuhan may refer to any one of the tram systems currently operational in the city of Wuhan, Hubei, China. The first tram started revenue service in Wuhan is the Auto-city T1 Line, which began on July 28, 2017. Subsequently, Optics Valley tram started revenue service from April 1, 2018.

Systems

Auto-city trams

Auto-city T1 line started revenue service on July 28, 2017, and is the first line of the Auto-city trams. At Chelun Square it is transferable to Zhuanyang Boulevard Station on Line 3, Wuhan Metro. The planned Auto-city tram system consists of 14 lines, ranging  and has some 277 stations. The line's 21 tramcars were built by CRRC Zhuzhou Locomotive.

Tram stops

Optics Valley trams

Two LRT corridors, totaling , in Wuhan's Optics Valley area started construction since 2013. Although officially there are two lines, a total of six services are operated. After several months of testing, both lines opened for revenue service on April 1, 2018. The LRV cars are designed by Fordyno and built by CRRC Changchun Railway Vehicles.

Tram stops

Hankou downtown trams
Trams were planned since the Qing dynasty when Hankou served as one of the major economic centers of China.
New plans to bring the never built trams back to the streets of Hankou downtown emerged around 2014. No actual construction has taken place as of 2017 in spite of the plans of the trams were made.

References

Wuhan
Transport in Wuhan